The Mercedes-Benz M08 engine is a naturally-aspirated and supercharged, 4.6-liter and 5.0-liter, straight-8 engine, designed, developed and produced by Mercedes-Benz; between 1928 and 1940.

Overview

Typ Nürburg 460 engine (1928–1929) 

Typ Nürburg 460 engine (1929–1932) 
For 1929, the company's first eight-cylinder model was extensively reworked by the newly appointed Technical Director Hans Nibel. The 8-cylinder engine and most other technical details were carried over unchanged from the 1928 car including the ratios chosen for the four-speed manual transmission.

Typ Nürburg 500 engine (1931–1933) 
In 1931, the car became available with an enlarged 4,918cc engine which now also featured a twin downdraft carburettor.

Typ 500 engine (1932–1936) 
In 1932 the W08 lost the “Nürburg” name, being sold simply as the Mercedes-Benz Typ 500.   The 4,918cc  side-valve engine with its twin downdraft carburetor was unchanged, as were the four-speed optional overdrive transmission, wheelbase, and list of standard body types.

Typ 500 engine (1936–1939) 
The cylinder capacity at 4,918cc was unchanged, but there was a marginal raising of the compression ratio. The claimed top speed was now raised further to 123 km/h (76 mph). The model was discontinued in 1939 without any immediate successor. Twenty-four years passed before the next 8-cylinder engined Mercedes-Benz appeared; with the Mercedes-Benz 600, in 1963.

Applications
Mercedes-Benz Nürburg 460 (W08)

References

Mercedes-Benz engines
Straight-eight engines
Engines by model
Gasoline engines by model